

R

Notes
  REK is common IATA code for Keflavík International Airport  and Reykjavík Airport .
  RIO is common IATA code for Rio de Janeiro–Galeão International Airport , Santos Dumont Airport , Jacarepaguá Airport  and Santa Cruz Air Force Base .
  ROM is common IATA code for Leonardo da Vinci–Fiumicino Airport  and Ciampino–G. B. Pastine International Airport .

References
General references
 
  - includes IATA codes
 
 Aviation Safety Network - IATA and ICAO airport codes
 Great Circle Mapper - IATA, ICAO and FAA airport codes
Specific citations

R